James Dow may refer to:

 James Dow (footballer) (1889–1972), English footballer
 James Dow (physician) (1911–1983), Scottish physician
 James L. Dow (1908–1977), Church of Scotland minister, broadcaster and author
 James R. Dow, professor of German at Iowa State University
 James Bremner Dow, Scottish businessman
 James Cameron-Dow (born 1990), South African cricketer